The Gârceneanca is a left tributary of the river Racova in Romania. It flows into the Racova in Pungești. The Gârceneanca Dam is located on this river.

References

Rivers of Romania
Rivers of Vaslui County